The MS Readathon is an annual sponsored read held by the MS Societies in Australia, Ireland, the United States, and Canada.


Australia 
The MS Readathon started in 1979, and is Australia’s premier reading-based fundraiser aimed at children. The MS Readathon encourages Australian children to read books, learn about multiple sclerosis (MS) and raise funds to help people living with multiple sclerosis.

Participants read as many books as they can throughout the month of August. The money they raise funds vital services for Australians living with MS, such as MS Family Camps, Family days & family support services.

In 2020 over $3.2 million was raised nationally from over 50,000 participants. In the same year the MS Readathon was also awarded two national awards by the Fundraising Institute of Australia (FIA). One for 'Impact through Events' and the top prize of the year 'Most Outstanding Fundraising Project'

For more information or to register your interest head to our website
msreadathon.org.au

Ireland 
The MS Readathon in Ireland is an annual sponsored read organised by the charity MS Ireland, encouraging children (and since 2003, adults) to read as many books as possible, and to collect a fixed amount per book from sponsors. The money collected goes towards MS Ireland's activities concerning sufferers of multiple sclerosis. 2004 was the event's 17th year. In 2003, the charity raised over 1.2 million euros.

References 

Multiple sclerosis
Multiple sclerosis organizations
Recurring events established in 1979
Annual events in the Republic of Ireland